This is a list of windmills in the English county of Warwickshire.

Locations

Maps
1722 Henry Beighton
1725 Henry Beighton
1731 Samuel & Nathaniel Buck, South-west prospect of Birmingham
1755 Thomas Jeffrey
1792 Sheriff
1800 Taylor
1800* Taylor (map of Worcestershire)
1822 Greenwood
1834 Ordnance Survey

Notes

Mills in bold are still standing, known building dates are indicated in bold. Text in italics denotes indicates that the information is not confirmed, but is likely to be the case stated.

Sources
Unless otherwise indicated, the source for all entries is:- or the linked Windmill World page.

References

History of Warwickshire

Lists of windmills in England
Windmills